Beka Vachiberadze (born 5 March 1996) is a Georgian-Ukrainian footballer who plays as a midfielder.

Club career
Born in Kutaisi, Georgia, Vachiberadze is a product of youth team systems of FC Chornomorets Odesa and FC Shakhtar Donetsk.

International career
Vachiberadze represented Ukraine in the different national youth teams, but later he switched to his native Georgia and it was confirmed in November 2017 by FIFA. As for 2021 he not made debut for Georgian national team.

Honours
Torpedo Kutaisi
Georgian Cup: 2022

References

External links 

1996 births
Living people
Sportspeople from Kutaisi
Ukrainian footballers
Ukraine youth international footballers
Footballers from Georgia (country)
Ukrainian people of Georgian descent
Association football midfielders
Ukrainian expatriate footballers
FC Shakhtar-3 Donetsk players
Betis Deportivo Balompié footballers
FK RFS players
Lommel S.K. players
FC Chornomorets Odesa players
FC Torpedo Kutaisi players
Segunda División B players
Latvian Higher League players
Challenger Pro League players
Ukrainian Premier League players
Ukrainian First League players
Ukrainian Second League players
Erovnuli Liga players
Ukraine under-21 international footballers
Expatriate footballers in Spain
Expatriate footballers in Latvia
Expatriate footballers in Belgium
Ukrainian expatriate sportspeople in Spain
Ukrainian expatriate sportspeople in Latvia
Ukrainian expatriate sportspeople in Belgium